Bythophyton is a genus of flowering plants belonging to the family Plantaginaceae.

Its native range is Eastern Himalaya.

Species:

Bythophyton indicum

References

Plantaginaceae
Plantaginaceae genera